The road signs, used on the Serbian road network, are regulated by the "Regulation of Traffic Signs", which was last time modified in 2017.

The road signs follow the Vienna Convention on Road Signs and Signals of 1968, and the former Yugoslav standard road signs, used by the successor states of SFR Yugoslavia. Inscriptions are in both Cyrillic and Latin alphabets. The SNV typeface is used on Serbian road signs as well as in other former Yugoslav states and neighboring Bulgaria and Romania. They are also used in Kosovo, although some of these signs were superseded by the Albanian road sign system, itself a copy of the Italian road sign system. In Montenegro, these road signs are only written in the Latin script since it became an independent state in 2006.

Category A: Warning signs

Category B: Prohibitory signs

Category C: Mandatory signs

Category D: Priority signs

Category E: Information signs

Category F:Traffic light signals
Serbia (and also the rest of former Yugoslavia) uses a slightly different color-coding system for routes, compared to most European nations. Along with Germany and Norway, the former Yugoslav countries are the only ones to use black text on yellow for non-roadworks purposes. The color coding is as such:

References

Notes 

Serbia